Harvey Hurd Lord (August 13, 1878 in Evanston, Illinois – May 3, 1920 in Chicago, Illinois) was an American track and field athlete who competed at the 1900 Summer Olympics in Paris, France.

Lord competed in the 400 metres. He placed third in his first-round (semifinals) heat and did not advance to the final. He also competed in the 800 metres, again finishing third in his semifinal heat to not advance to the final.

His daughter is the writer Eda Lord.

References

External links 

 De Wael, Herman. Herman's Full Olympians: "Athletics 1900". Accessed 18 March 2006.
 

1878 births
1920 deaths
Athletes (track and field) at the 1900 Summer Olympics
Olympic track and field athletes of the United States
American male sprinters
People from Evanston, Illinois
Sportspeople from Cook County, Illinois
Track and field athletes from Illinois
Chicago Maroons athletes